The 1927 Texas Mines Miners football team was an American football team that represented Texas School of Mines (now known as the University of Texas at El Paso) as an independent during the 1927 college football season.  Texas Mines hired E. J. Stewart as its coach for the 1927 season. Stewart had been the head football coach at the University of Texas from 1923 to 1926. In its first season under Stewart, the team compiled a 2–2–2 record and was outscored by a total of 78 to 69. The team won its annual rivalry game with New Mexico A&M by a 19-7 score.

Schedule

References

Texas Mines
UTEP Miners football seasons
Texas Mines Miners football